Power-on hours (POH) is the length of time, usually in hours, that electrical power is applied to a device.

A part of the S.M.A.R.T. attributes (originally known as IntelliSafe, before its introduction to the public domain on 12 May 1995, by the computer hardware and software company Compaq),

It is used to predict drive failure, supported by manufacturers such as Samsung, Seagate, Toshiba, IBM (Hitachi), Fujitsu, Maxtor, Kingston and Western Digital.

Power-on hours is intended to indicate a remaining lifetime prediction for hard drives and solid state drives, generally, "the total expected life-time of a hard disk is 5 years"  or 43,800 hours of constant use.

Once a drive has surpassed the 43,800 hour mark, it may no longer be classed as in "perfect condition".

Google tested over 100,000 consumer grade serial and parallel ATA hard disks, finding evidence that S.M.A.R.T. attributes like POH played a heavy role in device failures.

References

Survival analysis
Reliability analysis